The Ikarus 250 is a high-floor bus used as a coach for long-distance service. It was made from 1968–1989, alongside the smaller Ikarus 256, by the Hungarian bus manufacturer Ikarus.

Technical description 

Designed as a high-floor two-axle bus, the Ikarus 250 has a semi-self supporting body, with the engine installed under the floor at the back, following the configuration pioneered in West Germany by Setra in the 1950s and 1960s. The body platform incorporates two airsprung beam axles, with the rear axle being a planetary axle. The axles have two hydraulic shock absorbers each. Twin tyres are fitted on the rear axle, whilst single tyres are fitted on the front axle. The steering system is a hydraulically assisted ball-and-nut steering system. In total, the bus has three different braking systems: A pneumatic dual-circuit braking system, an exhaust braking system and a spring-loaded parking brake.

An MAN D 2156 engine, built under licence by Rába, powers the bus. It is a straight six-cylinder, naturally aspirated, liquid-cooled, Diesel engine with direct injection, displacing . The torque is transmitted to a fully synchronised five-speed gearbox via a single-disc dry-clutch; a six-plus-one-speed gearbox was also available as a factory option. It seats between 42 and 46 passengers.

Bibliography 
Werner Oswald: Kraftfahrzeuge der DDR. 2nd edition. Motorbuch-Verlag, Stuttgart 2000, p. 313

External links 

Ikarus buses
Coaches (bus)
Step-entrance buses
Vehicles introduced in 1968